Mira Ariel is a professor of linguistics at Tel Aviv University, specializing in pragmatics. A pioneer of the study of information structure, she is best known for creating and developing Accessibility Theory.

Education and career
After completing a BA in linguistics and English literature at Tel Aviv University in 1976, Ariel studied at the University of Pennsylvania, where she graduated with an MA in 1978. Ariel returned to Tel Aviv University in 1979 to pursue her PhD studies. She was advised by Tanya Reinhart and Ellen Prince and was awarded her PhD in 1986 with a dissertation entitled, Givenness marking. She subsequently spent a brief period as honorary research fellow in sociolinguistics at the University of London.

Ariel was hired as Lecturer at Tel Aviv University in 1988 and spent her whole career there, reaching the rank of full professor in 2006.

Honors 
From 2018 to 2019, she served as President of the Societas Linguistica Europaea.

In 2021 she was elected as a member of the Academia Europaea.

Research
Ariel’s research deals with issues in pragmatics and at the semantics-pragmatics interface and is mainly concerned with linguistic manifestations of reference to entities in discourse. Her body of work on Accessibility Theory makes the case that the language user’s choice of anaphora is governed by the notion of accessibility in memory. Ariel’s accessibility marking scale proceeds from low to high accessibility in the following order:

 Full name + modifier
 Full name
 Long definite description
 Short definite description
 Last name
 First name
 Distal demonstrative + modifier
 Proximal demonstrative + modifier
 Distal demonstrative (+ NP)
 Proximal demonstrative (+ NP)
 Stressed pronoun + gesture
 Stressed pronoun
 Unstressed pronoun
 Cliticized pronoun
 Verbal pronoun inflections
 Zero

Ariel's Accessibility Theory has been influential in a wide variety of domains beyond pragmatics, including cognitive linguistics, linguistic typology, sociolinguistics, discourse analysis, language acquisition, poetics, psycholinguistics, and natural language processing.

Selected publications
 Ariel, Mira. 1988. Referring and accessibility. Journal of Linguistics 24 (1), 65–87.
 Ariel, Mira. 1990. Accessing noun-phrase antecedents. London: Routledge. 
 Ariel, Mira. 1991. The function of accessibility in a theory of grammar. Journal of Pragmatics 16 (5), 443–463.
 Ariel, Mira. 1994. Interpreting anaphoric expressions: A cognitive versus a pragmatic approach. Journal of Linguistics 30 (1), 3–42.
 Ariel, Mira. 2001. Accessibility theory: an overview. In Ted Sanders, Joost Schilperoord, & Wilbert Spooren (eds.), Text representation: linguistic and psychological aspects, 29-87. Amsterdam: John Benjamins.
 Ariel, Mira. 2008. Pragmatics and grammar. Cambridge: Cambridge University Press. 
 Ariel, Mira. 2010. Defining pragmatics. Cambridge: Cambridge University Press.

References

External links 
 

Living people
Tel Aviv University alumni
Academic staff of Tel Aviv University
Women linguists
Pragmaticists
Year of birth missing (living people)
Members of Academia Europaea